Tekmeh Dash (also Romanized as Tikmeh Dāsh, Tikma Dash, and Tihma Dash; also known as Tikili Dash and Tikma Dash) is a city in Tekmeh Dash District of Bostanabad County, East Azerbaijan province, Iran. At the 2006 census, its population was 2,468 in 633 households. The following census in 2011 counted 2,645 people in 754 households. The latest census in 2016 showed a population of 2,974 people in 913 households.

References 

Bostanabad County

Cities in East Azerbaijan Province

Populated places in East Azerbaijan Province

Populated places in Bostanabad County